Dundrum is a stop on the Luas light rail tram system in Dublin, Ireland which serves the suburb of Dundrum.  It opened in 2004 as a stop on the Green Line, which re-uses the alignment of the Harcourt Street railway line which closed in 1958.  Dundrum Luas stop is built on the same site as a former heavy rail station of the same name.

History

Railway station (1854–1958)

The Harcourt Street railway line was built by the Dublin, Wicklow and Wexford Railway and opened in 1854, running from a temporary terminus at Harcourt Road near the city centre to Bray.  Dundrum was one of the four original intermediate stops.  The station was located at the side of Taney Road, which the line crossed on a bridge.

Dundrum was more elaborate than other stations on the Harcourt Street line.  It had buildings on both platforms: the up (Dublin-bound) platform featured waiting rooms and a signal box. The down platform was the location of the station master's house and the main station building with the ticket hall. This building had one storey, and its entrance from the platform was via a small portico with the roof suspended by a colonnade. This area could be used as a passenger waiting shelter.  The platforms were linked by both an iron footbridge and a granite subway.

A short siding was located to the south of the station, allowing trains to terminate.

Closure (1959–2004)
The Harcourt Street line had declined in use throughout the early 20th century and was closed by CIÉ at the end of 1958.  The tracks were lifted soon after and all stations on the route were auctioned off.  The waiting rooms, signal cabin, and house at Dundrum were demolished in the years that followed.  The station building survived, but fell into disuse.  The nearby bridge over the road was demolished in the 1970s.

Luas (2004–present)
Construction of the first phase of the Luas system commenced in 2001 and concluded in 2004.  The route chosen for the Green Line re-used the old Harcourt Street alignment between Charlemont and Stillorgan, and Dundrum station was rebuilt as a Luas stop.  The original subway was restored, allowing it to be once again used for passage under the tracks.  The surviving station building was not affected by construction, and remained at the side of the stop for many years in its derelict state.  However, it has since been restored and turned into a retail unit.

In the years following the original station's closure, the roads around it were rearranged into a crossroads. An elaborate cable-stayed bridge was constructed in the place of the old road bridge.  It was named the William Dargan Bridge in honour of William Dargan the engineer who built the original railway line.

In 2018, the platforms were lengthened from 45 to 55 metres.  This was to accommodate the new longer trams introduced to boost capacity.

Facilities and Services

Dundrum has the same facilities as the majority of stations along the Luas Green line, sheltered benches, ticket machines, signs, and time displays. In addition to these, the station also has a 24/7 Cycle and Ride Facility, with space for 52 bikes, made up of 10 bike lockers and 21 bike racks. The old station building, next to the southbound platform, is now two separate stores, a formal garment shop and a hat shop.  The building has been extended by turning the arches of the colonnade into windows, making it the exterior wall.

The stop has four entrances and exits: a pathway that leads from the southern end of the southbound platform to Taney Drive, a staircase adjacent to Dundrum's Main Street(a pedestrian subway links both these entrances for those wishing to avoid the stop altogether), A footpath along the Eastern side of the William Dargan Bridge links Churchtown Road Upper directly to the Luas Station, allowing pedestrians to avoid the busy road junction.  A lift provides step-free access from the northern end of the northbound platform to an open area at the side of the crossroads. This area was laid out so that bus services can connect with the Luas, and the entrance is marked with a sign of the same style as those on the platforms.

Service
Changing with the day, date and time, trams can range from running every 5 minutes to every 27 minutes and terminate at either Parnell or Broombridge in the north, and Sandyford or Brides Glen in the south.  The stop is also served by Dublin Bus routes 14, 44, 44B, 116.

References

Luas Green Line stops in Dublin (city)
Disused railway stations in County Dublin
Railway stations opened in 1854
Railway stations closed in 1958
1854 establishments in Ireland
Railway stations in the Republic of Ireland opened in the 19th century